Desmond Abbott (born 10 January 1986 in Darwin) is an Australian field hockey midfield/striker from the Northern Territory.   He is a member of the Australia men's national field hockey team, having made his debut on 28 January 2007.  He won gold medals at the Hockey Champions Trophy in 2008, 2009 and 2010, and a gold medal at the 2010 Commonwealth Games. He won a bronze medal at the 2008 Summer Olympics and unsuccessfully tried to secure a spot on the team to represent Australia at the 2012 Summer Olympics.

Personal
Abbott was born on 10 January 1986 in Darwin, Northern Territory, and is an Australian aboriginal. His first name is Desmond but he is called Des. One of his hobbies is playing Australia rules football. He works for a water corporation. His uncle is Joe Daby, one of the best ever Northern Territory field hockey players. He is recognized in the Australian Olympic Committee list of Australian Indigenous Olympians.

Field hockey
Abbott plays midfield and striker. When playing for the national team, he wears guernsey 32. He plays club hockey for the Aquinas Reds.  He plays for the NT Stingers in the Australian Hockey League, where he wears shirt number 17. He played in a June 2010 game for the NT Stingers against the Western Australia that Western Australia won 4–1.  He scored a goal in the game. In January 2005, he was a member of Australia's U21 national team and played in a five-game test series against Malaysia in Brisbane.  He was one of four Darwin, Northern Territory based players on the squad. In June 2005, he was one of five Northern Territory players to represent Australia on the U21 team at the World Cup. In 2009, he played professional hockey in the Netherlands.

National team
Abbott had his first cap for the senior side on 28 January 2007. during the Dutch Series in Canberra. In January 2008, he was a member of the senior national team that competed at the Five Nations men's hockey tournament in South Africa. He won the Hockey Champions Trophy in 2008, 2009 and 2010. He was a member of the 2009 Champions Trophy winning team, playing in the gold medal match against Germany that Australia won by a score of 5–3. He was a member of the Australian side that took home gold at the 2010 Commonwealth Games and the 2010 World Cup.

Abbott competed at the 2008 Summer Olympics where he won a bronze medal. In Australia's first game at the 2008 Games, he scored three goals in the game against Canada. He was the first Aboriginal to represent Australia at the Games in men's field hockey. He scored a goal in the bronze medal game against the Netherlands in the country's 6–1 victory. New national team coach Ric Charlesworth named him, a returning member, alongside fourteen total new players who had few than 10 national team caps to the squad before in April 2009 in a bid to ready the team for the 2010 Commonwealth Games. He did not compete at the Azlan Shah Cup in Malaysia in May 2011 because he was injured. In December 2011, he was named as one of twenty-eight players to be on the 2012 Summer Olympics Australian men's national training squad. This squad will be narrowed in June 2012.  He trained with the team from 18 January to mid-March in Perth, Western Australia. He was one of two players from the Northern Territory named to the squad. In February during the training camp, he played in a four nations test series with the teams being the Kookaburras, Australia A Squad, the Netherlands and Argentina. He missed part of the training camp because of a strained quad.

Recognition
In 2009, he was nominated for the Qantas NT Sportsperson of the Year. He was nominated as the International Hockey Federation 2008 Young Men's Player of the Year, where he finished second.

References

External links
 

1986 births
Living people
Australian male field hockey players
Olympic field hockey players of Australia
Field hockey players at the 2008 Summer Olympics
Olympic bronze medalists for Australia
Olympic medalists in field hockey
Indigenous Australian Olympians
Indigenous Australian field hockey players
Medalists at the 2008 Summer Olympics
Sportspeople from Darwin, Northern Territory
Commonwealth Games gold medallists for Australia
Commonwealth Games medallists in field hockey
Field hockey players at the 2010 Commonwealth Games
2010 Men's Hockey World Cup players
Medallists at the 2010 Commonwealth Games